Sollander is a Swedish surname that may refer to
Lotta Sollander (born 3 July 1953), Swedish alpine skier 
Stig Sollander (25 June 1926–12 December 2019), Swedish alpine skier, father of Lotta
Bobo Sollander (born 26 June 1985), Swedish footballer, son of Lotta and grandson of Stig

Swedish-language surnames